Bryn Mawr Hospital, part of Main Line Health, is a 264-bed acute care hospital located in Bryn Mawr, Pennsylvania. Founded in 1893, Bryn Mawr Hospital has been named among U.S. News & World Report’s Best Hospitals in the Philadelphia region. Bryn Mawr Hospital also received the Joint Commission’s Gold Seal of Approval for quality.

Bryn Mawr Hospital and its outpatient site at Newtown Square offer a full range of services and programs including a cancer program, orthopaedics, cardiovascular care, behavioral health, pediatrics, bariatric surgery and weight wellness, neurointervention, gender care program, plastic and reconstructive surgery, general surgery, breast cancer program, obstetrics and maternity, including and a level III neonatal intensive care unit.

In 2010, Main Line Health opened a 250,000-square-foot Pavilion that is home to new private patient rooms, a new intensive care unit, two medical/surgical telemetry units, 12 operating rooms, a 25-bed maternity unit, labor and delivery unit and neonatal intensive care unit.

Fiscal Year 2022 Statistics

 Full-time employees: 1,362 
 Total discharges: 13,485 
 Licensed beds: 264 
 Births: 1,730 
 Bassinets: 26 
 Outpatient visits: 209,329 
 ER visits: 38,079 
 Total surgeries: 8,998

References

About Main Line Health
Main Line Health, a community-based not-for-profit health system, that includes Bryn Mawr Hospital, Lankenau Medical Center, Riddle Hospital, Paoli Hospital, Bryn Mawr Rehabilitation Hospital, Mirmont Treatment Center, and Lankenau Institute for Medical Research.

External links
 Bryn Mawr Hospital website
 Main Line Health website

Hospitals in Pennsylvania
Lower Merion Township, Pennsylvania
Buildings and structures in Montgomery County, Pennsylvania
Hospitals established in 1893
1893 establishments in Pennsylvania